Michael Jon O'Brien (born October 23, 1965) is an American former competition swimmer who won the gold medal in the men's 1,500-meter freestyle event in a time of 15:05.20 at the 1984 Summer Olympics in Los Angeles, California.

See also
 List of Olympic medalists in swimming (men)
 List of University of Southern California people

References

External links

 Official webpage
 
 

1965 births
Living people
American male backstroke swimmers
American male freestyle swimmers
Olympic gold medalists for the United States in swimming
Swimmers at the 1983 Pan American Games
Swimmers at the 1984 Summer Olympics
Swimmers at the 1987 Pan American Games
USC Trojans men's swimmers
Medalists at the 1984 Summer Olympics
Pan American Games gold medalists for the United States
Pan American Games bronze medalists for the United States
Pan American Games medalists in swimming
Universiade medalists in swimming
Universiade silver medalists for the United States
Medalists at the 1985 Summer Universiade
Medalists at the 1983 Pan American Games
Medalists at the 1987 Pan American Games
20th-century American people
21st-century American people